Alistair "Al" Walker (born 21 March 1944 in Vancouver, British Columbia – died 25 January 2021 in Berkshire, UK) was a racing driver from England.  He participated in Formula 3, Formula 2, World Championship of Makes, and the South African Springbok Series.  After his active racing career was over, he participated in some Historic Racing and restored several significant historic vehicles.  In 2004 Alistair bought a WWII RAF Air Sea Rescue boat, one of few survivors of the type, in rough condition and commenced a restoration.  The boat was finished in time to represent the RAF Museum in Queen Elizabeth's 2012 Thames Diamond Jubilee Pageant.

Racing record

References 

1944 births
2021 deaths
English racing drivers
British Formula Three Championship drivers
European Formula Two Championship drivers
Racing drivers from British Columbia
Sportspeople from Vancouver
World Sportscar Championship drivers